José Luis "Kuki" Zalazar Martínez (born 5 May 1998) is a Spanish professional footballer who plays as a forward for Deportivo de La Coruña.

Club career
Born in Montevideo, Kuki moved to Spain at early age and started his career with Albacete Balompié's youth setup. On 30 May 2012, aged only 14, he was signed by Málaga CF.

Kuki made his senior debut with the reserves on 31 August 2014, starting in a 0–0 home draw against Atlético Mancha Real in the Tercera División. The following March, he was linked to potential moves to Premier League sides Liverpool, Chelsea and Manchester City.

Kuki scored his first senior goal on 30 August 2015, in a 3–3 home draw against CD El Ejido 2012. The following January, he was targeted by FC Barcelona.

On 24 June 2017, Kuki scored a brace in a 4–2 home win against AD Unión Adarve, but his side narrowly missed out promotion in the play-offs. On 8 August, he was loaned to Segunda División B side FC Cartagena, for one year.

On 30 August 2018, Kuki moved to another reserve team, Real Valladolid B in the third division. He made his first-team debut on 31 October, starting in a 2–1 away defeat of RCD Mallorca, in the season's Copa del Rey.

Zalazar made his La Liga debut on 19 January 2021, coming on as a late substitute for Roque Mesa in a 2–2 home draw against Elche CF. On 27 August, after the Valladolid's relegation, he moved to Segunda División side SD Ponferradina.

On 31 August 2022, Zalazar terminated his contract with Ponfe, and signed a two-year deal with Deportivo de La Coruña just hours later.

Personal life
Kuki is the son of former Uruguay international footballer José Zalazar, a midfielder who notably represented Albacete. His younger brother Rodrigo Zalazar is also a footballer, and currently plays for German club FC Schalke 04

References

External links

1998 births
Living people
Footballers from Montevideo
Spanish people of Uruguayan descent
Spanish footballers
Uruguayan footballers
Uruguayan emigrants to Spain
Association football forwards
Segunda División players
Segunda División B players
Tercera División players
Atlético Malagueño players
FC Cartagena footballers
Real Valladolid Promesas players
Real Valladolid players
SD Ponferradina players
Deportivo de La Coruña players
Spain youth international footballers